Peterson dos Santos (born 31 March 1991) is a Brazilian sprinter. He competed in the 4 × 400 m relay at the 2016 Olympics.

References

1991 births
Living people
Brazilian male sprinters
Olympic athletes of Brazil
Athletes (track and field) at the 2016 Summer Olympics
21st-century Brazilian people